The Kinabalu squirrel (Callosciurus baluensis) is a species of rodent in the family Sciuridae. It is endemic to highland forest in East Malaysia. Its name is a reference to Mount Kinabalu, though it is not restricted to this mountain. Its tail and upperparts are grizzled blackish, the underparts are reddish-orange, and the flanks have a narrow buff stripe with a broader black stripe below.

References

Thorington, R. W. Jr. and R. S. Hoffman. 2005. Family Sciuridae. pp. 754–818 in Mammal Species of the World a Taxonomic and Geographic Reference. D. E. Wilson and D. M. Reeder eds. Johns Hopkins University Press, Baltimore.

Callosciurus
Rodents of Malaysia
Endemic fauna of Borneo
Fauna of the Borneo montane rain forests
Mammals described in 1901
Taxa named by J. Lewis Bonhote
Taxonomy articles created by Polbot